George L. Savvides is the Attorney-General of the Republic of Cyprus. He previously served as Minister of Justice and Public Order of the Republic of Cyprus.

References 

Living people
Cyprus Ministers of Justice and Public Order
Attorneys-General of Cyprus
1959 births
People from Famagusta
People from Limassol
Alumni of the University of Exeter
Cypriot high jumpers
Cypriot expatriates in the United Kingdom
Members of the Middle Temple